Wilsons Pocket is a rural locality in the Gympie Region, Queensland, Australia. In the  Wilsons Pocket had a population of 197 people.

History 
The locality was named after Albert Henry (Shepherd) Wilson, (1845 to 1886), one of the earliest landholders in the area. Wilson was born in Shepton Mallet, Somerset, England, and he immigrated to New South Wales on the "Bolton" in 1853. He married Mary Cahill at Proston station on 8 June 1869 and they had two sons. He selected Portion 1120, Parish of Goomborian on 20 July 1878 which was granted on 1 March 1883. From 1875 to about 1882, he worked at the Golden Crown gold mine in Gympie, but may have been farming his selection on Tinana Creek at the same time. He obtained a tin miner's licence in Herberton in April 1882 and died at the Mount Wells tin mine in the Northern Territory in 1886. Following Albert Wilson's death, the title for the property on Tinana Creek was transferred to his wife, Mary Wilson on 29 April 1887.

Wilson's Pocket Provisional School opened in 1924. By 1930 it had become Wilson's Pocket State School. It closed in 1962.

In the  Wilsons Pocket had a population of 197 people.

References 

Gympie Region
Localities in Queensland